A microsystem is a self-contained subsystem located within a larger system. It generally constitutes the smallest unit of analysis in systems theory.

Ecological systems theory
Urie Bronfenbrenner uses the term in his ecological systems theory where it constitutes the most immediate environment which envelops an individual. Thus in a child’s development it consists of parents, guardians, other family members, and close friends who constitute the immediate home circle.

References

Systems theory